Caroline Mary Series  (born 24 March 1951) is an English mathematician known for her work in hyperbolic geometry, Kleinian groups and dynamical systems.

Early life and education

Series was born on March 24, 1951, in Oxford to Annette and George Series. She attended Oxford High School for Girls and from 1969 studied at Somerville College, Oxford, where she was interviewed for admission by Anne Cobbe. She obtained a B.A. in Mathematics in 1972 and was awarded the university Mathematical Prize. She was awarded a Kennedy Scholarship and studied at Harvard University from 1972, obtaining her Ph.D. in 1976 supervised by George Mackey on the Ergodicity of product groups.

Career and research
In 1976–77 she was a lecturer at University of California, Berkeley, and in 1977–78 she was a research fellow at Newnham College, Cambridge. From 1978 she was at the University of Warwick, first as a lecturer, then, from 1987, as a reader, and from 1992 as a professor. From 1999 to 2004 she was Engineering and Physical Sciences Research Council (EPSRC) Senior Research Fellow at the University of Warwick.

In the 1970s, Series found illustrations of Rufus Bowen's Theory of Dynamic Systems in the geometry of continued fractions and two-dimensional hyperbolic geometry, effect of Fuchsian groups. After that she investigated similar, including fractal, geometric patterns in three-dimensional hyperbolic spaces, with Kleinian groups  as symmetry groups. The computer images led to a book project with David Mumford and David Wright, which took over ten years. Other coauthors with whom she published in this area include Linda Keen and Joan Birman.

Series became the third woman to be president of the London Mathematical Society when she held the post in 2017–2019.

She is emeritus professor in mathematics at the University of Warwick.

Selected publications
 with David Mumford and David Wright: Indra's Pearls. Cambridge University Press 2002.
 
 
 
Series, Wright Non euclidean geometry and Indra´s Pearls, Plus Magazine

Awards and honours
In 1987 she was awarded the Junior Whitehead Prize by the London Mathematical Society. In 1992 she held the Rouse Ball Lecture in Cambridge, and in 1986 she was the invited speaker at the International Congress of Mathematicians in Berkeley (Symbolic Dynamics for Geodesic Flows). From 1990 to 2001 she was the editor of the Student Texts of the London Mathematical Society. In 1986 she was a founding member of European Women in Mathematics (EWM). In 2009 she was the Emmy Noether visiting professor at the University of Göttingen. She was elected  a Fellow of the American Mathematical Society in its inaugural class of 2013. She is an Honorary Fellow of Somerville College.
1972 –74 Kennedy Scholarship, Harvard University 
1987 Junior Whitehead Prize, London Mathematical Society  
2014 Senior Anne Bennett Prize, London Mathematical Society 
2016 Fellow of the Royal Society
2017 Elected to the Academia Europaea

Personal life
She is the daughter of the physicist George Series.

References

External links

1951 births
Living people
Alumni of Somerville College, Oxford
Harvard University alumni
20th-century English mathematicians
21st-century English mathematicians
British women mathematicians
Academics of the University of Warwick
Fellows of the American Mathematical Society
Members of Academia Europaea
Whitehead Prize winners
Fellows of the Royal Society
Female Fellows of the Royal Society
Fellows of Somerville College, Oxford
20th-century women mathematicians
21st-century women mathematicians